Murray, Utah was declared a city July 3, 1902, instituting a mayor-council form of government. The mayor of Murray was originally partisan, but switched to a non-partisan position.  The term of mayor was originally two years, but amended to a four-year term in the 1940s in accordance with state law. The following is a list of Mayors of Murray, Utah.

Murray, Utah
Mayors